= Nestania =

Town of ancient Arcadia

Nestania (Ancient Greek: Νεστανία) was a town of ancient Arcadia mentioned by Stephanus of Byzantium.
